Bill Guyton (born 17 March 1990) is a New Zealand rugby union player. He played at halfback for provincial side Tasman. Guyton spent the previous three years playing for North Otago in the Heartland championship, making 29 appearances for the province. He then moved north to sign with the Tasman Mako ahead of 2013 season's ITM Cup.

Tasman
2013 saw Guyton establish himself as the starting halfback for Tasman as they went on to have a successful season and win the champion division in the ITM Cup, with a 1-point win over Hawke's Bay 26–25. This saw Tasman Mako promoted to the Premership Division of the ITM Cup.

Super Rugby
A strong season for the Tasman Mako saw Guyton Sign with the Hurricanes for the 2014 super rugby season.

In 2014 super rugby season saw Guyton get very little game time for the Hurricanes. This saw Guyton initially released for the 2015 season, but a season-ending injury to Willi Heinz saw the Crusaders sign him as a replacement for the remainder of the 2015 super rugby season.

Māori All Blacks
In October 2016 Guyton, who affiliates to the Ngāpuhi, Ngāti Pikiao, and Ngāti Raukawa iwi, was named in the Māori All Blacks team for their end-of-year tour to the Northern Hemisphere.
Billy Guyton also played for the NZ Heartland XV at Fullback and Wing.

Where is he now
In 2021 Guyton became director of sport at Waitaki Boys' High School.

References

External links
 itsrugby.co.uk profile

1990 births
Living people
New Zealand rugby union players
Tasman rugby union players
North Otago rugby union players
Hurricanes (rugby union) players
Crusaders (rugby union) players
Blues (Super Rugby) players
Rugby union scrum-halves
People educated at Nelson College
People educated at Shirley Boys' High School
Rugby union players from Timaru
Māori All Blacks players
Ngāpuhi people
Ngāti Pikiao people
Ngāti Raukawa people